Azazel Jacobs (born September 27, 1972) is an American film director and screenwriter. He is the son of experimental filmmaker Ken Jacobs. His short films include Kirk and Kerry and Message Machine, and his features include the acclaimed Momma's Man, Terri, The Lovers, and French Exit.

Biography 
Jacobs grew up in a jewish family in the Tribeca neighborhood of Manhattan. He attended Bayard Rustin High School. He received a bachelor's degree in film from SUNY Purchase and a master's degree from the AFI Conservatory. , Jacobs lives in Los Angeles.

His feature The Goodtimeskid (2005), a micro-budget film, gained a cult following and was later re-released by KINO International.

Jacobs film Momma’s Man premiered at Sundance 2008. Upon its release by KINO International, The New York Times declared the film to be "Independent Film defined."

In 2011, Jacobs film Terri, also written by Patrick deWitt, premiered in competition at Sundance and in competition internationally at Locarno & the BFI London Film Festival’s "Film On The Square."

During 2014 and 2015, Jacobs directed the two seasons of the SKY/HBO show, Doll & Em. He also worked as a writer and producer.

In 2017, Jacobs wrote and directed the film The Lovers which was released by A24 to top specialty box office. The film starred Debra Winger, Tracy Letts, Melora Walters, and Aiden Gillen. Jacobs screenplay for The Lovers was nominated for a 2017 Independent Spirit Award for Best Screenplay.

Jacobs produced the pilot of Cherries, written/directed by Diaz Jacobs, which premiered in the episodic section of Sundance 2018.

In 2020, Jacobs' film French Exit had its world premiere as the closing night film for The New York Film Festival, 2020. It was based on a novel by Patrick deWitt of the same name. The film starred Michelle Pfeiffer alongside Lucas Hedges, Tracy Letts, Imogen Poots, Danielle McDonald, Isaach de Bankole, Valerie Mahaffey, Susan Coyne and Daniel Di Tomasso. Michelle Pfeiffer plays Francis Price, "delivering a role for which she'll be remembered." - Variety Nominated for multiple awards, including a 2021 Golden Globe, and won Best Actress from the Canadian Screen Awards. Valerie Mahaffey was nominated for an 2021 Independent Spirit Award for Best Supporting Female.

French Exit was released theatrically by Sony Pictures Classics on February 12, 2021, and internationally by Sony Pictures Worldwide on March 18, 2021. Azazel Jacobs film French Exit was selected for the 71st Berlin Film Festival in Berlinale Special Gala, having its European premier on Sat Jun 12, 2021.

Azazel Jacobs appeared on Marc Maron's Podcast, WTF With Marc Maron, on March 29, 2021, speaking about art films, The Clash, Mad Magazine, and his movies Terri, The Lovers and French Exit.

Other work 
Jacobs directed two episodes of the Facebook series Sorry For Your Loss starring Elizabeth Olsen, and three episodes of Amazon's Mozart in the Jungle, for which he was a consulting producer in its final season.

Azazel recently completed directing the initial season of an eight-episode animated children's show, Fables, for Bron Entertainment.

Filmography

Feature films 
Nobody Needs to Know (2003)
The GoodTimesKid (2005)
Momma's Man (2008)
Terri (2011)
The Lovers (2017)
French Exit (2020)

Short films 
Kirk and Kerry (1997)
Danger 44 (1999)
Dear Mexico (2000)
Message Machine (2002)
Oh Wee! (2003)

TV shows 
 Doll & Em (2014)
 Mozart in the Jungle (2016)
 Sorry for Your Loss (2018)
 Cherries (2018)

Awards

 Jacobs' short film Kirk and Kerry won the Grand Jury Prize for Best Dramatic Short at the Slamdance Film Festival.
 In 2008, Momma’s Man won the Kraków Film Award at the first annual Off Plus Camera Film Festival.
In 2011, Terri addition to receiving the Youth Jury Award at Locarno, Terri garnered both Gotham and Spirit Award nominations (Acting & Screenplay).
In 2012, CinemaScope magazine cited Azazel as one of the 50 Best Directors Under 50.
 Momma’s Man was nominated for the Politiken's Audience Award at CPH PIX, the Grand Special Prize at the Deauville Film Festival, and for Best Feature Film Prize of the City of Torino at the Torino Film Festival. Momma's Man won the Distribution Award and FIPRESCI Award at the IndieLisboa International Independent Film Festival and the Reader Jury of the "Standard" award at Viennale.
Terri was nominated for the Grand Jury Prize at the Sundance Film Festival, for the Grand Special Prize at the Deauville Film Festival, and for Narrative Feature Jury Prize at the Sarasota Film Festival. Terri won the FIPRESCI Award for Best Feature Film and was nominated in the Grand Prix Asturias for Best Film at the Gijón International Film Festival.Terri was nominated for a Golden Leopard and placed 3rd in the Junior Jury Awards at the Locarno International Film Festival.
 The Lovers was nominated for a Best Screenplay Independent Spirit Award at the Film Independent Spirit Awards and for Best Film in Official Competition at the London Film Festival.
The Lovers screenplay was nominated for a 2018 Independent Spirit Award.

References

External links
 

1972 births
20th-century American male writers
20th-century American screenwriters
21st-century American male writers
21st-century American screenwriters
AFI Conservatory alumni
American male screenwriters
Film directors from New York City
Living people
People from Tribeca
Place of birth missing (living people)
Screenwriters from New York (state)
State University of New York at Purchase alumni
Writers from Manhattan